Takolabad (also Romanized as Takolābād; also known as Takol, Tavakkolābād, Tavakkolābād-e Kahnūj, and Tavakkol Abad Kahnooj) is a village in Jazmurian Rural District, Jazmurian District, Rudbar-e Jonubi County, Kerman Province, Iran. At the 2006 census, its population was 225, in 45 families.

References 

Populated places in Rudbar-e Jonubi County